A Season for Miracles is a 1999 American made-for-television Christmas drama film based on a novel of the same name by Marilyn Pappano. Directed by Michael Pressman, it originally aired as a Hallmark Hall of Fame presentation on CBS on December 12, 1999.

Plot summary
Emilie Thompson (Carla Gugino) is forced to take charge of her nephew J.T. (Evan Sabara) and niece Alanna (Mae Whitman) when their drug-addicted mother (Laura Dern) overdoses and the children are threatened with foster care. Fleeing the authorities, the trio come across the sleepy town of Bethlehem, Rhode Island, just before Christmas. Even though the authorities have been temporarily left behind, Emilie will need a miracle to keep her family together. A versatile guardian angel (Patty Duke), who assumes a variety of earthly guises, helps, along with the small town-folk who are surprisingly friendly. One "coincidence" after another gives the struggling family a chance at happiness.

Cast
 Carla Gugino as Emilie Thompson
 Kathy Baker as Ruth Doyle
 David Conrad as Police Captain Nathan Blair
 Laura Dern as Berry Thompson
 Patty Duke as Angel
 Lynn Redgrave as Hon. Judge Nancy Jakes
Mary Fogarty as Agatha
 Faith Prince as Sadie Miller
 Evan Sabara as J.T. Thompson
 Mae Whitman as Alanna 'Lani' Thompson
 Mary Louise Wilson as Corinna
 Kurt Deutsch as Alexander Foster
 Scott Sowers as Deputy Howie
 Paul Collins as Gerald Foster
Gail Grate as Holly McBride

Critical reception
Ray Richmond of Variety called the film "a holiday grab bag of improbability stacked atop improbability."

See also
 List of Christmas films
 List of films about angels

References

External links
 
 A Season for Miracles at Hallmark Channel

1999 television films
1999 films
1990s Christmas drama films
American Christmas drama films
Films about angels
Films set in Rhode Island
Television shows based on American novels
Christmas television films
CBS network films
Hallmark Hall of Fame episodes
Films directed by Michael Pressman
Films scored by Craig Safan
American drama television films
1990s American films